Zoom is the ninth and final studio album by French–Algerian singer Rachid Taha. It was released by Wrasse Records on 2 April 2013. It was produced by guitarist Justin Adams, with featured guests Mick Jones and Brian Eno. Jones also toured with Rachid Taha as part of the Zoom project.

"Now or Never" (words & music by Aaron Schroeder & Wally Gold and previously recorded by Elvis Presley) features Jeanne Added singing in English. The video clip was directed by Marc-Antoine Serra and was shot in Naples. A video clip was also made for "Voilà, Voilà".

Track listing
"Wesh (N'amal)"
"Zoom sur oum"
"Jamila"
"Now or Never"
"Fakir"
"Ana"
"Les artistes"
"Khalouni/Ya oumri"
"Algerian Tango"
"Galbi"
"Voilà voilà"

Personnel
Rachid Taha – vocals
Billy Fuller – bass
Justin Adams – guitar
Mick Jones – guitar
Rodolphe Burger – guitar
Hakim Hamadouche – lute
Brian Eno – percussion, bass, brass, vocals
Jeanne Added - featured vocalist on "Now or Never"

References

External links
Official website
Rachid Taha et Jeanne Added "Now or never" - Acoustic / TV5MONDE (YouTube)

2013 albums
Rachid Taha albums